Thaddeus Lê Hữu Từ (28 October 1896 – 24 April 1967) was a Vietnamese Catholic prelate who served as the Apostolic Vicar of Phát Diệm from 1945 to 1959. He was also a supreme advisor to the early government of the Democratic Republic Vietnam. As a leading Vietnamese Catholic nationalist figure during the First Indochina War, Từ was an ardent opponent of both French colonialism and Vietnamese communism.

References

Further reading 
 

1896 births
1967 deaths
20th-century Roman Catholic bishops in Vietnam
Participants in the Second Vatican Council
Cistercian bishops
People from Quảng Trị province